Schellas Hyndman (born November 4, 1951) is a retired soccer coach. He was previously head coach of FC Dallas in Major League Soccer.

Despite having a limited career as a professional athlete, Hyndman is one of the most successful college soccer coaches in American sports history, compiling a 466–122–49 record as the head coach at Southern Methodist University. He was the 1981 NSCAA Coach of the Year.

Playing career

Youth and college

Hyndman was born in Macau. He was born to a Russian-French mother and a Portuguese father, but after the communist revolution in China his family fled the country in the cargo hold of a ship in 1957. They moved to Springfield, Ohio before settling in Vandalia, Ohio where he attended Butler High School.  Following high school, he entered Eastern Illinois University on a soccer scholarship. He was part of the 1969 NAIA national men's soccer championship team as a freshman. He graduated from Eastern Illinois with a bachelor's degree in physical education in 1973.

Professional
In 1975, Hyndman spent one season as a professional player with the Cincinnati Comets in the American Soccer League.

Coaching career
In the fall of 1973, Hyndman entered Murray State University, graduating with a master's degree in 1975.  In addition to taking classes, he also coached the men's soccer team. In 1976, he moved to Sao Paulo, Brazil where he taught at Escola Graduada and served as a staff coach with the São Paulo Futebol Clube. In 1977, he returned to the U.S. to become the head coach at Eastern Illinois University, then competing in the NCAA Division II. Over seven seasons, he compiled a 98–24–11 record. In 1978, Hyndman took the Panthers to third in the NCAA post-season tournament. In 1979, he topped that as Eastern Illinois finished runner-up to Alabama A&M. In 1981, the team moved up to the NCAA Division I, taking third place in the 1981 Division I tournament. That led to his being selected as the 1981 NSCAA Coach of the Year.  He was inducted into the Eastern Illinois Athletic Hall of Fame in 2001.

In 1984, Southern Methodist University hired Hyndman as head coach of the Mustangs soccer team. Over the next twenty-four seasons, he compiled a 368–96–38 record, earning eight league Coach of the Year honors, five regional Coach of the Year honors.

On June 16, 2008, FC Dallas of Major League Soccer hired Hyndman as head coach after the sacking of Steve Morrow. In 2010, he coached Dallas to the MLS Cup Final, losing to Colorado Rapids. Hyndman resigned following the 2013 season.

On January 13, 2015, he was named head men's soccer coach at Grand Canyon University.  In 2018, Grand Canyon became the third school he led into the NCAA Division I Men's Soccer Championship.

Administration
In 2001, Hyndman was selected to serve as a member of the NSCAA Executive Committee.  In January 2005, he became President of the NSCAA, serving in that capacity for one year.

Personal life
Hyndman is also an established Aiki Ju-Jutsu coach, and has been teaching the discipline for over 25 years in the Dallas area. Hyndman is a 10th degree black belt with Juko Kai Int'o.
  He is now married to Kami Hyndman and has three children.  His grandson Emerson Hyndman currently plays for Atlanta United of Major League Soccer.

Coaching career statistics

1.Includes league, playoffs, cup and CONCACAF Champions League.

College

References

External links
 SMU Mustangs coaching profile

1951 births
Living people
American people of Russian descent
American people of French descent
American people of Portuguese descent
Macau emigrants to the United States
American soccer players
Association football midfielders
Eastern Illinois Panthers men's soccer players
Cincinnati Comets players
American Soccer League (1933–1983) players
American soccer coaches
Eastern Illinois Panthers men's soccer coaches
SMU Mustangs men's soccer coaches
FC Dallas coaches
Grand Canyon Antelopes men's soccer coaches